Kothandaramar Temple is a Hindu temple located in Vaduvur, Tiruvarur district of Tamil Nadu, India, dedicated to Lord Rama, the seventh avatar of Lord Vishnu. This temple is called as the Dakshina Ayodhya(Ayodhya of South India). It is one of the Abhimana sthalams of Lord Vishnu.

Location

It is located in the village of Vaduvur in Thanjavur-Mannargudi road. This temple is also known as Dakshina Ayodhya.

Presiding deity

The presiding deity of this temple is known as Kothandaramar. He is found with Sita, Lakshmana and Hanuman. The utsava moorthy of lord Rama in this temple is very famous for its beauty.

Other shrines

In the prakara, shrines of Hayagrivar, Viswaksenar, Andal and Alvars are found in this temple. In the front mandapa, Krishna with the name of Venugopalan is found in a separate shrine with Rukmani and Satyabama. Before the presiding deity of SriRamachandra was kept in the sanctum sanctorum, Sri Rajagopalan statue was found there.  Sarayu theertham is found outside the temple. The vimana of this temple is known as Pushpaka vimana.

Origin of the Temple 
The idol of Sri Rama and family was found inside a forest (hidden underground) by Raja Sirufoji of Thanjavur Maratha clan. On his way to Thanjavur, he took rest under a tree where he heard the chant of Jai Shri Rama coming from the ground when he dug up the earth he found the idol of Sri Rama, Devi Sita, Bharatha, Lakshmana, Shatrugana and Hanuman. The people of the nearby villagers banned the exit of idols from the village. So the King ordered the statue of Bharata and Shatrugana be placed instead of Sri Rama and Lakshmana for worship in the village temple. The villagers constructed a temple with Sri Bharata as Sri Rama and Shatrugana as Lakshmana with the new Sita Devi statue. When the procession of idol neared Vaduvur area they took rest. In the dream of Maratha King, Sri Rama appeared and told the king to place the statues in the nearby Sri Krishna Temple. The Maratha Raja built the Sarayu tank and renovated the temple.

Religious significance 

This temple is one of the *  Pancha Rama Kshetras and considered the foremost among the five temples. Pancha means five and Kshetrams refers to holy places. All the five temples are situated in Tiruvarur district, Tamil Nadu. 

 Sri Kodhanda Ramar Temple, Mudikondan
 Sri Kodhanda Ramar Temple, Adambar
 Sri Ramar Temple, Paruthiyur   
 Sri Kodhanda Ramar Temple, Thillaivilagam
 Sri Kodhanda Ramar Temple, Vaduvur

Festivals 

Rama Navami, Garuda Seva and  car festival are celebrated in a grand manner.

References 

Pancha Rama Kshetras

External links 

 Vaduvur (Vaduvoor) Temple Website
 இழந்ததையெல்லாம் தருவார் வடுவூர் ராமர், இந்து தமிழ் திசை, 24 மார்ச் 2018
 வடுவூர் கோதண்டராமர் கோயில் தேரோட்டம் திரளான பக்தர்கள் வடம் பிடித்தனர், தினத்தந்தி, 22 ஏப்ரல் 2019
 Pancha Rama Kshetras
Sarvam Rama Mayam
Sthala Puranam

Hindu temples in Tiruvarur district
Vishnu temples
Rama temples